Barrow's Stores, also known as Barrow's, was an upmarket department store located in Birmingham, England.

History
Barrow's Stores was originally started by Richard Cadbury, of the Cadbury family. Richard opened a small drapery store in 1794 in Bull Street. By 1824 the Cadbury family opened a new shop next door selling tea, coffee and cocoa.

However, in 1849 John Cadbury transferred the business to his cousin Richard Cadbury Barrow so they could concentrate on the manufacture of chocolate. The business was renamed Barrow's Stores.

By 1905 the store had been rebuilt with a new cafe on the first floor for the customers to try the companies products, and had numerous departments from glass & china to food.

In the 1960s Barrow's moved from their location on the corner of Bull Street and Corporation Street to a smaller store on Corporation Street opposite Lewis', where the new store concentrated on food. The business was purchased by Fitch Lovell in 1964, and in December 1973 merged Barrow's into its supermarket chain Key Markets.

His fascination for Barrow's led J.R.R. Tolkien to name his student club T.C.B.S. (acronym for: Tea Club and Barrovian Society) after the store.

References

Defunct department stores of the United Kingdom
Defunct companies based in Birmingham, West Midlands
Retail companies of England
British companies established in 1849
Retail companies established in 1849
Retail companies disestablished in 1973
1849 establishments in England
1973 disestablishments in England
British companies disestablished in 1973
Delicatessens in the United Kingdom
Luxury brands
Food retailers of the United Kingdom
Department store buildings in the United Kingdom